The 1922 South Dakota gubernatorial election was held on November 7, 1922.  Incumbent Republican Governor William H. McMaster ran for re-election to a second term. After beating back a challenge in the Republican primary from perennial candidate George W. Egan, McMaster advanced to the general election, where he faced former State Senate President Louis N. Crill, the Democratic nominee, and suffragist Alice Lorraine Daly, the Nonpartisan League's nominee, and the first woman to run for Governor. McMaster won by a large margin, but the race was considerably narrower than the 1920 election.

Primary elections

Democratic Primary
Louis N. Crill, the former President of the State Senate and the 1902 Democratic nominee for Governor, was the only Democratic candidate to file for Governor and won the nomination unopposed.

Republican Primary

Candidates
 William H. McMaster, incumbent Governor
 George W. Egan, disbarred attorney, perennial candidate

Results

General election

Results

References

South Dakota
1922
Gubernatorial
November 1922 events